Jouni Ilari Kaipainen (24 November 1956 – 23 November 2015) was a Finnish composer.

Kaipainen was born in Helsinki to the physician and politician Osmo Kaipainen, and his wife, the author Anu  Mustonen. He studied at the Sibelius Academy in Helsinki under Aulis Sallinen and Paavo Heininen. He died on November 23, 2015, on the eve of his 59th birthday.

List of compositions

Works for the stage 
Konstanzin ihme (The Miracle at Constance) Op. 30, opera in two acts, unfinished
Hämäränmaassa Op. 69 (2004), music play for children

Works for orchestra 
Apotheosis Op. 7 (1975), for chamber orchestra
Symphony No. 1 Op. 20 (1980–85)
Symphony No. 2 Op. 44 (1994)
Sisyfoksen uni (Sisyphus Dreams) Op. 47 (1994)
Accende lumen sensibus, concerto for small symphony orchestra Op. 52 (1996)
Millennium Fanfare Op. 60 (1999)
North by North-East Op. 63 (2000–01)
Symphony No. 3 Op. 72 (1999–2004)
Erik (...jag hör det ständigt...) Op. 78 (2006)
notkea keaton (The Ghost of Buster) Op. 86 (2008–09)
Commedia, Symphony No. 4 Op. 93 (2010/2012), with TTBB choir, baritone and soprano soloists

Works for solo instrument(s) and orchestra 
Carpe diem! for Clarinet and Orchestra Op. 38 (1990)
Concerto for Oboe and Orchestra Op. 46 (1994)
Vernal Concerto, From Equinox to Solstice for Saxophone Quartet and Orchestra Op. 53 (1996)
Piano Concerto Op. 55 (1997)
Concerto for Viola and Orchestra Op. 56 (1997)
Nyo ze honmak kukyo to Op. 59b (1999)
Concerto for Horn and Orchestra Op. 61 (2000–01)
Concerto for Cello and Orchestra no. 1 Op. 65 (2003)
Concerto for Cello and Orchestra no. 2 (work in progress)
Concerto for Trumpet and Orchestra Op. 66 (2003)
Concerto for Bassoon and Orchestra Op. 74 (2005)
Chamber Concerto No. 1 Op. 73, ("...and then is heard no more...")
Concerto for Violin and Orchestra Op. 76 (2006)
Concerto for Trombone and Orchestra "Life is..." Op. 100  (2014)

Works for vocal soloist(s) and orchestra 
Felicity & Fullnesse Op. 75 (2006), monodrama – introduction, aria and scene
The Canticle of Brother Sun Op. 88 (2009) for soprano, baritone and orchestra

Chamber works 
Quartetto I Op. 2 (1973)
Quartetto II Op. 5 (1974)
Aspetti Op. 6 (1974)
Ladders to Fire Op. 14 (1979)
Trois morceaux de l'aube Op. 15 (1980–81)
Far from Home Op. 17 (1981)
Trio I Op. 21 (1983)
Elegia Op. 22 (1983)
Parcours Op. 23a (1983)
Parcours Op. 23b  (1983–89)
Titus’ Elegy Op. 24b (1983)
Quartetto III Op. 25 (1984)
Piping Down the Valleys Wild Op. 26 (1984)
Andamento Op. 28 (1986)
Trio III Op. 29 (1986–87)
Tombeau de Rabelais Op. 32 (1987/1995/1997/2001)
Remous Op. 37a (1990)
Remous Op. 37b  (1990–97)
Quartetto IV Op. 45 (1994)
Time flies Op. 48 (1994–95)
Sestetto (Sextet) Op. 57a (1997)
Sestetto (Sextet) Op. 57b (1997)
Weigold-Walzer (1999)
Clarinet Quintet Op. 59a (2000)
String Quartet no. 5 Op. 70 (2004)
Inno, for viola and piano (2010). First performance: 6.7.2010 at Västanfjärd church (Finland). Kimito Island Music Festival. Wen Xiao Zheng (viola), Martti Rautio (piano)

Works for solo instrument 
Sonatina Op. 9 (1976)
“...la chimère de l'humidité de la nuit?” Op. 12b (1978)
Je chante la chaleur désespérée Op. 16 (1981)
Altaforte Op. 18 (1982)
Conte Op. 27 (1985)
Gena Op. 31 (1987)
L’anello di Aurora Op. 34 (1988)
Tenebrae Op. 39 (1991)
Serenade: Full Moon, Lunatic Bassoon Op. 42 (1993)
Vento Op. 58 (1998)
Placido Op. 68 (2003–05)
Reunion confirmed Op. 71 (2004)
Three preludes (2006)

Vocal and choral works 
Quatro Canciones de García Lorca Op. 8 (1975) for baritone and piano
Yölauluja (Nocturnal Songs) Op. 11 (1978) 
Cinq poèmes de René Char Op. 12a (1978–80)
Pitkän kesän poikki iltaan (The Long Summer's Journey into Evening) Op. 13 (1979) for soprano and ensemble
Muunlaisten musiikkia (Music of Persons of Another Kind) Op. 19 (1984) for mezzo-soprano and piano
Three Arias from “The Miracle at Constance” Op. 30b (1987–97)
Three Arias from “The Miracle at Constance” Op. 30d (1987–93)
Anna's Aria from “The Miracle at Constance” Op. 30f (1987–93)
Stjärnenatten (Starry Night) Op. 35 (1989)
Lacrimosa Op. 36 (1989)
Antiphona SATB Op. 40, Super ‘Alta Trinitá Beata’ (1992) for children's choir and male choir a cappella
Jauchzet! Op. 41a (1993) for mixed choir a cappella
Jauchzet! Op. 41b (1993) for mixed choir and orchestra
Sonnet 43 Op. 43 (1994) for soprano and piano
Matkalla (On the Road) Op. 49 (1995) for mixed choir, percussion and strings
Runopolku (Rune Walk) Op. 50 (1995) for soprano and piano
Glühende Blumen des Leichtsinns Op. 51 (1995–2000) for soprano and string quartet
Des Flußes Stimme Op. 54, Ein Requiem, Jeremy Parsons in memoriam (1996) for mixed choir a cappella
Rauha ja Onni (Peace and Happiness) Op. 64 (2001) for soprano and piano
En skål för alla kvinnors ära Op. 67 (2003–05) for soprano, horn and piano 
En skål för alla kvinnors ära Op. 67a  (2003)
...ohikulkua ja epäilystä... (...bypassing and doubts...), monodrama for mezzo-soprano and string quartet
Var det Edith? Op. 95 (2011) for soprano, string quartet, double bass and piano. First performance: 17.7.2011 at Kimito church. Kimito Island Music Festival. Helena Juntunen (soprano), Rodin-Quartett: Sonja Korkeala, Gerhard Urban (violin), Martin Wandel (viola), Clemens Weigel (violoncello), Ulrich Wolff (double bass), Eveliina Kytömäki (piano)
Tyttöjä ja kuolemaa ("Deaths and Maidens") Op. 101 (2014) for male choir

External links 
Entry at the Finnish Music Information Centre

References 

1956 births
2015 deaths
20th-century classical composers
21st-century classical composers
Finnish classical composers
Sibelius Academy alumni
Musicians from Helsinki
Finnish male classical composers
20th-century male musicians
21st-century male musicians
20th-century Finnish composers
21st-century Finnish composers